Vladimir Obradović (born 4 February 1981) is a Serbian tennis coach and former professional tennis player.

Biography
Obradović, a right-handed player with a one handed backhand, trained at Belgrade's Partizan Tennis Club.

In 2002 he featured in a Davis Cup tie for Serbia and Montenegro, against South Africa on his home court in Belgrade. Serbia and Montenegro secured the tie in the first of the reverse singles, which gave Obradović an opportunity to play the final match, a dead rubber he lost to Justin Bower. 

He attended the University of Florida and played collegiate tennis before turning professional.

On tour he featured at Futures and Challenger level, as well as the qualifying draws of several ATP Tour tournaments. In 2008 he made the semi-finals of the Izmir Challenger and had a win over former French Open finalist Mariano Puerta on clay at the Samarkhand Challenger. His only Challenger title was in doubles, the 2008 edition of the Men's Pro Challenger at Tunica National, which he won partnering Izak Van der Merwe.

Challenger titles

Doubles: (1)

See also
List of Serbia Davis Cup team representatives

References

External links
 
 
 

1981 births
Living people
Serbia and Montenegro male tennis players
Serbian male tennis players
Serbian tennis coaches
Tennis players from Belgrade
Florida Gators men's tennis players